John Russell Scott (12 July 1879 – 5 April 1949) was a British publisher. He was the owner of the Manchester Guardian and the Manchester Evening News.

Early life 
Scott was born in Manchester, the third child of C. P. Scott and his wife Rachel Susan Cook.

Scott attended Rugby School and studied engineering at Trinity College, Cambridge and the Massachusetts Institute of Technology.

Career 
At the request of his father, Scott took over the post of managing director of the Guardian in 1905. After the death of his brother Edward Taylor Scott in 1932, he became the sole majority owner of the publishing company The Manchester Guardian and Evening News Ltd as chairman and Governing Director.

Scott Trust 
In 1936 he transferred control of the publisher and its periodicals to a newly created trust, the Scott Trust, so as to ensure the independence of the newspapers and their reporting. Scott was the first and only chairman of this first Scott Trust, which was dissolved in 1948, after a tax law was changed so that this type of trust was also subject to inheritance tax, and a new statute was created. In 2008 the trust was dissolved again and replaced with The Scott Trust Limited, which is the owner of the Guardian to the present.

Personal life 
In 1908 Scott married Olga Briggs, with whom he had two sons and two daughters. He lived in Wilmslow.

References 

British publishers (people)
1879 births
1949 deaths